The Husband Hunter is a 1920 American comedy-drama film directed by Howard M. Mitchell starring Eileen Percy and Emory Johnson. Note that there was also a British film in 1920 with the same name.

Plot

Cast
{| 
! style="width: 180px; text-align: left;" |  Actor
! style="width: 230px; text-align: left;" |  Role
|- style="text-align: left;"
|Eileen Percy||Myra Hastings
|-
|Emory Johnson||Kent Whitney
|-
|Jane Miller||Lilah Elkins
|-
|Evans Kirk||Bob Harkness
|-
|Edward McWade||Charles Mack
|-
|John Steppling||Kelly
|-
|Harry Dunkinson||Arthur Elkins
|-
|}

Gallery

References

External links

1920 films
American silent feature films
American black-and-white films
Associated Exhibitors films
Fox Film films
Films with screenplays by Joseph F. Poland
Films directed by Howard M. Mitchell
1920s English-language films
1920s American films
Silent American comedy-drama films